Hobart Harlequins Rugby Club is a Rugby Union club in Tasmania. Established in 1933, the club is a member of the Tasmanian Rugby Union and Tasmanian Rugby Union Juniors, affiliated with the Australian Rugby Union and plays in the Tasmanian Statewide League.
 
The club's home ground is at Rugby Park in Cornelian Bay, Tasmania. Known as the Harlequins or Quins, the club colours are Blue, Red, Green and Black. The club currently fields a teams in Men's First and Second Divisions, a Senior Women's squad and junior teams. Notable player is Adam Coleman.

Premierships

Senior Team
Premiers First Grade 1936,1937,1938,1946,1947,1948, 1963;1964,1968,1974,1988,2013
Premiers Second Grade 1949, 1995, 2006
Premiers u16  2010
(Recess 1940–1945)

See also

List of sports clubs inspired by others

References

External links
Australian Rugby Union
Tasmanian Rugby Union
Hobart Harlequins Rugby Club

Rugby union teams in Tasmania
Women's rugby union in Tasmania
Rugby clubs established in 1933
1933 establishments in Australia
Sport in Hobart
Diaspora sports clubs in Australia
Women's rugby union teams in Australia